Ronald "Ron" James Baker,  (24 August 1924 – 12 December 2020) was a Canadian academic administrator. He was the first president of the University of Prince Edward Island (1969-1978).

Born in London, England, Baker served with the Royal Air Force from 1943 to 1947 and trained in Manitoba. In 1947, he emigrated to Canada. He received a Bachelor of Arts degree in 1951 and a Master of Arts degree in 1953 from the University of British Columbia both in English. From 1954 to 1956, he did graduate work in the School of Oriental and African Studies at the University of London. In 1962, he was appointed associate professor at the University of British Columbia. 

While at UBC, Baker was involved in the production of John B. Macdonald's report, Higher Education in British Columbia and a Plan for the Future (1962), which led directly to the development of a second university (SFU) in the Lower Mainland. In 1964, he became the first faculty member hired by the President of Simon Fraser University, Patrick McTaggart-Cowan. He was the Director of Academic Planning at Simon Fraser University and served as the first head of the English Department.

From 1969 to 1978, he was president of the University of Prince Edward Island. He retired in 1991 and died in December 2020 at the age of 96.

Honours
In 1978, he was made an Officer of the Order of Canada. He was awarded the Queen Elizabeth II Silver Jubilee Medal, the 125th Anniversary of the Confederation of Canada Medal, the Queen Elizabeth II Golden Jubilee Medal, and the Queen Elizabeth II Diamond Jubilee Medal. He has received honorary degrees from the University of New Brunswick (1970), Mount Allison University (1977), University of Prince Edward Island (1989), and Simon Fraser University (1990).

References

1924 births
2020 deaths
Alumni of SOAS University of London
Canadian university and college chief executives
English emigrants to Canada
Officers of the Order of Canada
Military personnel from London
Royal Air Force personnel of World War II
Academic staff of Simon Fraser University
University of British Columbia alumni
Academic staff of the University of British Columbia
Academic staff of the University of Prince Edward Island